Roman Catholic Diocese of Sault Sainte Marie may refer to:

 Roman Catholic Diocese of Sault Sainte Marie, Michigan, a titular see in Michigan, United States
 Roman Catholic Diocese of Sault Sainte Marie, Ontario, an active suffragan diocese in Ontario, Canada